Gangster is a 1994 Hindi film. The movie starred Dev Anand as the lead actor. It also starred Mamta Kulkarni and Manu Gargi as the romantic pair of the movie.

Plot
The story is about a priest, Father Pereira (played by Dev Anand), who unwittingly becomes a witness to the rape and murder of a village woman by the rich man of the village, Chandulal Seth (played by Ajit). Father Ferriera is framed for the crime by Chandulal Seth and is sent to the jail instead. During the jail time spent, Father Ferriera develops a good friendship with some of the jail mates. On release from the jail, he along with his former jail mates decide on taking revenge with Chandulal Seth, who is now one of the richest jewelers of the world.

Cast
Dev Anand
Mamta Kulkarni
Manu Gargi
Ajit as Chandulal Seth
Sudhir
Deepak Tijori

Soundtrack
Soundtrack was composed by Jatin-Lalit and penned by M. G. Hashmat.

References

External links
Gangster on IMDb

1994 films
1990s Hindi-language films
Films directed by Dev Anand
Films scored by Jatin–Lalit
Indian films about revenge
Indian rape and revenge films